is the name of the area located at the base of Mount Fuji in the Yamanashi Prefecture of Japan. The name Fuji Five Lakes comes from the fact that there are five lakes formed by previous eruptions of Mount Fuji. The principal city in the region, Fujiyoshida, has a population of roughly 54,000 and is particularly famous for its udon noodles. Another point of interest is Aokigahara Jukai Forest. The Fuji Five Lakes was selected by the Tokyo Nichi Nichi Shimbun and Osaka Mainichi Shimbun as one of the Twenty-Five Winning Sites of Japan in 1927.

Lakes of the Fuji Five Lakes

The five lakes are located in an arc around the northern half of Mount Fuji. In ancient times, lava flow from a volcanic eruption of Mount Fuji spread across the area, damming up rivers and resulting in the formation of these lakes. They are all considered excellent tourist attractions and fishing spots.

Lake Kawaguchi

Lake Kawaguchi (河口湖 Kawaguchi-ko) is the most famous of the five lakes, and images of this lake are usually used in posters and commercials for the Fuji Five Lakes area. A large number of hotels line its banks, as do locals providing boat rides to the tourists. It is the only lake in the Fuji Five Lakes area that has an island. Many local cultural events are held near this lake throughout the year.

Lake Motosu
This lake, along with Lake Sai and Lake Shōji, was formed by lava flowing across what is now Aokigahara Jukai Forest and into the enormous lake that once dominated the area, and these three lakes remain still connected by underground waterways.

Lake Sai 
 
The western side of Sai (西湖 Sai-ko) shares its banks with the infamous Aokigahara Jukai Forest.

Lake Shōji
Lake Shōji (精進湖 Shōji-ko) is the smallest of the five lakes. Remnants of lava flow still jut out of the water. Locals usually fish from these rocks.

Lake Yamanaka

Tourism industry
Most of the capital coming into the area comes from the tourism industry. Approximately 100,000,000,000 yen is spent by 9,000,000 sightseers every year. The main attractions of the area include:
 Mount Fuji
 Onsens
 Fuji-Q Highland – an amusement park featuring one of the world's highest roller coasters.
 The lakes – sightseeing, sailing, and fishing.
 Hiking and mountain climbing.
 Village of Healing (いやしの里 iyashinosato）– a historically accurate, rebuilt Japanese village.

References

External links

 
 Fuji Five Lakes — travel info, includes a map.
 Fujigoko TV
 Kawaguchiko's government office - English homepage

Chūbu region
Fuji-Hakone-Izu National Park
Geography of Yamanashi Prefecture
Tourist attractions in Yamanashi Prefecture
Lake groups of Japan
Mount Fuji